Northeast Derby is the name given to the football matches played among the northeastern I-League teams Aizawl, TRAU and NEROCA. Aizawl was first promoted to I-League in 2015-16 season followed by NEROCA and TRAU in 2017-18 and 2019–20 respectively.

Other teams which were also a part of this derby in the past were Shillong Lajong (2009–10), United Sikkim (2012-13 season), Rangdajied United (2013-14 season) and Royal Wahingdoh (2014-15 season). Aizawl is the only northeastern club to win I-League.

History 
The first match of a northeast derby in I-League was played between Shillong Lajong of Meghalaya and United Sikkim of Sikkim in Paljor Stadium, Gangtok on 8 December 2012 which ended in a goalless draw. United Sikkim got relegated at the end of the season while Shillong  Lajong got relegated in 2018-19. Aizawl from Mizoram got promoted in 2015-16 but again got relegated at the end. They were promoted once again in the next season due to some reasons and became the champions. 2017-18 season saw the promotion of another northeastern team NEROCA from Manipur.

Shillong Derby 
From 2013 to 2015 there were consecutive promotions and relegations of Meghalayan teams Rangdajied United (2013-14) and Royal Wahingdoh (2014-15). During this short tenure the two teams played against Shillong Lajong respectively in the Shillong Derby. The first match of the derby in I-League to be played was on 22 November 2013 between Shillong Lajong and Rangdajied United that ended in a 1–1 draw. The next season the derby was played between Shillong Lajong and Royal Wahingdoh, with the first meeting in I-League on 18 January 2015 that ended with Royal Wahingdoh as the winner by 1–2. Both the rivalries continued thereafter in Shillong Premier League for a brief period until the teams were dissolved.

Imphal Derby 
In 2019–20, another Manipuri team, TRAU got promoted, thus the beginning of Imphal Derby. The derby is contested between NEROCA and TRAU, and was first played on 8 January 2020, in which TRAU emerged as the maiden winner of the derby by the scoreline of 2–1. The derby had already begun even before the inclusion of TRAU in I-League, when the two local rivals contested against each other in Manipur State League. The Imphal Derby gained fame in 2022 during the 131st edition of Durand Cup when competitive football returned to the city after COVID-19 pandemic in India. The Government of Manipur declared a half-holiday for all governmental and educational institutions in build-up to the match on 18 August, in which TRAU was defeated by NEROCA 3–1 in Group-C opener.

Teams

Statistics

Current Teams 
Updated on 11 March 2021

Aizawl vs NEROCA

Matches

TRAU vs NEROCA (Imphal Derby)

Matches

TRAU vs Aizawl

Former Teams 
Other teams include the northeastern teams which played in I-League in the past, until they were either dissolved or relegated to lower leagues.

Shillong Lajong vs Aizawl

Shillong Lajong vs NEROCA

Shillong Lajong vs United Sikkim

Shillong Lajong vs Royal Wahingdoh (Shillong Derby)

Shillong Lajong vs Rangdajied United (Shillong Derby)

Head-to-head ranking in I-League (2009-present) 
 - United Sikkim;  - Royal Wahingdoh;  - Rangdajied United;  - Shillong Lajong;  - Aizawl;  - NEROCA;  - TRAU

Notes

 In 2010-11 season, there were no clubs from Northeast India

Recent meetings (I-League)

2019–20 season

a.Due to COVID-19 pandemic, match was cancelled.

2020–21 season

b.Due to COVID-19 pandemic, matches were played behind closed doors.
c.Due to COVID-19 pandemic, all I League matches were played in West Bengal.

Honours  
 I-League:
Aizawl (2016–17)
 I-League 2nd Division:
Shillong Lajong (2011)
United Sikkim (2012)
Randajied United (2013)
Royal Wahingdoh (2014)
Aizawl (2015)
NEROCA (2016–17)
TRAU (2018–19)

See also 
 Kolkata Derby
 South Indian Derby
 I-League
 Super Cup (India)
 List of association football rivalries

References

Association football rivalries in India
NEROCA FC
Aizawl FC
TRAU FC